Tom Bishop (born 1991), is an English male International lawn bowler.

Bowls career
Bishop won the English National title in 2012 representing the Atherley club and Hampshire. By winning the National title he represented England at the 2013 World Singles Champion of Champions event in Christchurch, New Zealand where he won the gold medal defeating Alistair White of Scotland 8-4, 9-5 in the final.

He switched clubs from Atherley BC in Hampshire to Bromley BC in Kent and was runner-up in the 2019 National Championships Two Wood singles.

Personal life
He studied Construction Project Management at Aston University.

References

1991 births
Living people
English male bowls players